Canon 1324 is a canon of the 1983 Code of Canon Law that enumerates situations according to which penalties prescribed in canon law must be diminished or replaced by a penance. The canon does not automatically remove the penalty completely except in cases of latae sententiae (automatic) excommunication.

Cases to which the canon applies 

The diminution or replacement of the penalty must be applied if the offence was committed by:
 Someone with imperfect use of reason
 Someone temporarily lacking the use of reason because of drunkenness or some similar mental disturbance
 Someone who, while not altogether losing the use of reason, acts in the heat of passion, without having deliberately provoked that passion
 Someone not yet sixteen years old
 Someone who acts out of grave fear, necessity or serious inconvenience when the act is intrinsically evil or tends to harm souls (if the act committed in these circumstances is not intrinsically evil or harmful to souls, then there is no penalty)
 Someone who acts in lawful self-defence but without due moderation (if due moderation was used, then there is no penalty)
 Someone who reacts against grave and unjust provocation by another
 Someone who erroneously but culpably thought the circumstances mentioned in parenthesis above under numbers 5 and 6 existed, circumstances that according to canon 1323 exempt from all penalty
 Someone who was inculpably unaware that a penalty was attached to the law or precept against which he offended
 Someone who acted with grave but not full imputability

In the circumstances listed above latae sententiae (automatic) excommunications do not apply.

A judge may diminish or replace a prescribed penalty also in view of other circumstances that reduce the gravity of the offence.

Claimed applications

Excommunication of Marcel Lefebvre 
The SSPX argues that Marcel Lefebvre's ordination of four bishops on 30 June 1988 (the Ecône consecrations) in contravention of a direct order from Pope John Paul II, was due to a state of necessity, citing in his defense canons 1323 and 1324 of the 1983 Code of Canon Law.

Abortion on a minor in Brazil

In March 2009, after an abortion on a nine-year-old girl raped by her stepfather and pregnant with twins had been performed to save her life, Archbishop José Cardoso Sobrinho of Olinda and Recife stated that latae sententiae excommunication had been incurred by the girl's mother and the medical team. The National Conference of Bishops of Brazil disowned his statement, saying that, in accordance with canon law, the mother was certainly not excommunicated, since she had acted "out of grave fear" (cf. no. 5 of this canon) and there was insufficient evidence to show that any member of the medical team was acting with the full awareness and contumacy envisaged in this canon (cf. nos. 8 and 9). Bishop Jean-Michel di Falco of Gap, France also denied the applicability to the girl's mother of canon 1398 of the 1983 Code of Canon Law, which imposes automatic excommunication for procuring a completed abortion, pointing out that canon 1324 states that automatic censures, such as that which applies for such abortions, do not affect those who act out of grave fear.

References

Catholic penal canon law
Canons (canon law)